Volume 1 is the debut studio album from Canadian rock band The Besnard Lakes. Only a thousand copies were made for the 2003 release. The album was rereleased on a larger scale October 23, 2007.

The cover features the Princeton Similkameen Funeral Services home - the owner of which was charged in 2007 with fraud and offering an indignity to human remains.

Track listing

References

The Besnard Lakes albums
2003 debut albums